Batuque is an African-inspired or Afro-Brazilian religion, practiced mainly in Brazil. The religion started in the city of Porto Alegre, the capital of Rio Grande do Sul.

References 

Religion in Brazil
Afro-American religion
Porto Alegre